The 1890 Connecticut gubernatorial election was held on November 4, 1890. Democratic nominee Luzon B. Morris defeated Republican nominee Samuel E. Merwin with 50.01% of the vote. 

The law at the time specified that if no candidate received a majority, the state legislature would decide the election. Morris received 50.01% of the vote, a mere 26 votes more than the majority needed to win. There were irregularities among ballots in Bridgeport as well. The state legislature, having split control, could not agree on a winner, and the result was challenged and deadlocked over the next two years.

Due to these challenges, Morris was not seated as Governor and the incumbent Governor Morgan Bulkeley remained in office, despite not running in the election.

General election

Candidates
Major party candidates
Luzon B. Morris, Democratic
Samuel E. Merwin, Republican

Other candidates
Phineas M. Augur, Prohibition
Henry C. Baldwin, Labor

Results

References

1890
Connecticut
Gubernatorial